Galloping Gallagher is a 1924 American silent Western film directed by Albert S. Rogell and starring Fred Thomson, Hazel Keener, and Frank Hagney. The film was originally five reels long, only 29 minutes of which survive today.

Plot
As described in a film magazine review, with the help of his horse Silver King, Bill Gallagher captures a couple of bandits who are terrorizing the town of Tombstone and is made sheriff. Evelyn Churchhill, a young woman evangelist, is kidnapped by outlaws. Burke, the Tombstone Bank president, is the secret leader of the gang. After Bill rescues Evelyn, Burke manages to have him arrested. Bill's horse brings the jail keys to his master. Bill gets loose, whips and exposes Burke, and wins the affection of Evelyn.

Cast

References

External links
 

1924 films
1924 Western (genre) films
Films directed by Albert S. Rogell
1920s English-language films
Film Booking Offices of America films
American black-and-white films
Silent American Western (genre) films
1920s American films